Inductive charging (also known as wireless charging or cordless charging) is a type of wireless power transfer. It uses electromagnetic induction to provide electricity to portable devices. Inductive charging is also used in vehicles, power tools, electric toothbrushes, and medical devices. The portable equipment can be placed near a charging station or inductive pad without needing to be precisely aligned or make electrical contact with a dock or plug.

Inductive charging is named so because it transfers energy through inductive coupling. First, alternating current passes through an induction coil in the charging station or pad. The moving electric charge creates a magnetic field, which fluctuates in strength because the electric current's amplitude is fluctuating. This changing magnetic field creates an alternating electric current in the portable device's induction coil, which in turn passes through a rectifier to convert it to direct current. Finally, the direct current charges a battery or provides operating power.

Greater distances between sender and receiver coils can be achieved when the inductive charging system uses resonant inductive coupling, where a capacitor is added to each induction coil to create two LC circuits with a specific resonance frequency. The frequency of the alternating current is matched with the resonance frequency, and the frequency is chosen depending on the distance desired for peak efficiency. Recent improvements to this resonant system include using a movable transmission coil (i.e., mounted on an elevating platform or arm) and the use of other materials for the receiver coil such as silver-plated copper or sometimes aluminum to minimize weight and decrease resistance due to the skin effect.

History

Induction power transfer was first used in 1894 when M. Hutin and M. Le-Blanc proposed an apparatus and method to power an electric vehicle. However, combustion engines proved more popular, and this technology was forgotten for a time.

In 1972, Professor Don Otto of the University of Auckland proposed a vehicle powered by induction using transmitters in the road and a receiver on the vehicle. In 1977, John E. Trombly was awarded a patent for an "Electromagnetically coupled battery charger." The patent describes an application to charge headlamp batteries for miners (US 4031449). The first application of inductive charging used in the United States was performed by J.G. Bolger, F.A. Kirsten, and S. Ng in 1978. They made an electric vehicle powered with a system at 180 Hz with 20 kW. In California in the 1980s, a bus was produced, which was powered by inductive charging, and similar work was being done in France and Germany around this time.

In 2006, MIT began using resonant coupling.  They were able to transmit a large amount of power without radiation over a few meters.  This proved to be better for commercial needs, and it was a major step for inductive charging.

The Wireless Power Consortium (WPC) was established in 2008, and in 2010 they established the Qi standard.  In 2012, the Alliance for Wireless Power (A4WP) and the Power Matter Alliance (PMA) were founded.  Japan established Broadband Wireless Forum (BWF) in 2009, and they established the Wireless Power Consortium for Practical Applications (WiPoT) in 2013.  The Energy Harvesting Consortium (EHC) was also founded in Japan in 2010.  Korea established the Korean Wireless Power Forum (KWPF) in 2011. The purpose of these organizations is to create standards for inductive charging. In 2018, The Qi Wireless Standard was adopted for use in military equipment in North Korea, Russia, and Germany

Application areas
Applications of inductive charging can be divided into two broad categories: Low power and high power:
 Low power applications are generally supportive of small consumer electronic devices such as cell phones, handheld devices, some computers, and similar devices which normally charge at power levels below 100 watts. Typically, the AC utility frequency of 50 or 60 Hertz is used.
 High power inductive charging generally refers to inductive charging of batteries at power levels above 1 kilowatt. The most prominent application area for high power inductive charging is in support of electric vehicles, where inductive charging provides an automated and cordless alternative to plug-in charging. Power levels of these devices can range from approximately 1 kilowatt to 300 kilowatts or higher. All high-power inductive charging systems use resonated primary and secondary coils. These systems work in the long wave range with frequencies up to 130 kHz. The use of short wave frequencies can enhance the system's efficiency and size but would eventually transmit the signal worldwide. High powers raise the concern of electromagnetic compatibility and radio frequency interference.

Advantages
 Protected connections – No corrosion when the electronics are enclosed, away from water or oxygen in the atmosphere. Less risk of electrical faults such as short circuits due to insulation failure, especially where connections are made or broken frequently.
 Low infection risk – For embedded medical devices, the transmission of power via a magnetic field passing through the skin avoids the infection risks associated with wires penetrating the skin.
 Durability – Without the need to constantly plug and unplug the device, there is significantly less wear and tear on the socket of the device and the attaching cable.
 Increased convenience and aesthetic quality – No need for cables.
 Automated high power inductive charging of electric vehicles allows for more frequent charging events and consequently an extension of driving range.
 Inductive charging systems can be operated automatically without dependence on people to plug and unplug. This results in higher reliability.
 Automatic operation of inductive charging in roads theoretically allows vehicles to run indefinitely.

Disadvantages
The following disadvantages have been noted for low-power (i.e., less than 100 watts) inductive charging devices, and may not apply to high-power (i.e., greater than 5 kilowatts) electric vehicle inductive charging systems.
 Slower charging – Due to the lower efficiency, devices take 15 percent longer to charge when supplied power is the same amount. 
 More expensive – Inductive charging also requires drive electronics and coils in both device and charger, increasing the complexity and cost of manufacturing.
 Inconvenience – When a mobile device is connected to a cable, it can be moved around (albeit in a limited range) and operated while charging. In most implementations of inductive charging, the mobile device must be left on a pad to charge, and thus can't be moved around or easily operated while charging.  With some standards, charging can be maintained at a distance, but only with nothing present between the transmitter and receiver.
 Compatible standards – Not all devices are compatible with different inductive chargers.  However, some devices have started to support multiple standards.

Inefficiency has other costs besides longer charge times.  Inductive chargers produce more waste heat than wired chargers, which may negatively impact battery longevity. An amateur 2020 analysis of energy use conducted with a Pixel 4 found that a wired charge from 0 to 100 percent consumed 14.26 Wh (watt-hours), while a wireless charging stand used 19.8 Wh, an increase of 39%. Using a generic brand wireless charging pad and mis-aligning the phone produced consumption up to 25.62 Wh, or an 80% increase. The analysis noted that while this is not likely to be noticeable to individuals, it has negative implications for greater adoption of smartphone wireless charging.

Newer approaches reduce transfer losses through the use of ultra thin coils, higher frequencies, and optimized drive electronics. This results in more efficient and compact chargers and receivers, facilitating their integration into mobile devices or batteries with minimal changes required. These technologies provide charging times comparable to wired approaches, and they are rapidly finding their way into mobile devices.

Safety
An increase in high-power inductive charging devices has led to researchers looking into the safety factor of the electromagnetic fields (EMF) put off by larger inductor coils. With the recent interest in the expansion of high power inductive charging with electric cars, an increase in health and safety concerns has arisen. To provide a larger distance of coverage you would in return need a larger coil for your inductor. An electric car with this size conductor would need about 300 kW from a 400 V battery to emit enough charge. This much exposure to the skin of a human could prove harmful if not met within the right conditions. Exposure limits can be satisfied even when the transmitter coil is very close to the body.

Testing has been done on how organs can be affected by these fields when put under low levels of frequency from these fields. When exposed to various levels of frequencies you can experience dizziness, light flashes, or tingling through nerves. At higher ranges, you can experience heating or even burning of the skin. Most people experience low EMF in everyday life. The most common place to experience these frequencies is with a wireless charger, usually on a nightstand located near the head.

Standards

Standards refer to the different set operating systems with which devices are compatible.  There are two main standards: Qi and PMA. The two standards operate very similarly, but they use different transmission frequencies and connection protocols. Because of this, devices compatible with one standard are not necessarily compatible with the other standard.  However, there are devices compatible with both standards.
Magne Charge, a largely obsolete inductive charging system, also known as J1773, used to charge battery electric vehicles (BEV) formerly made by General Motors.
 The emerging SAE J2954 standard allows inductive car charging over a pad, with power delivery up to 11 kW.
 Qi, an interface standard developed by the Wireless Power Consortium for inductive electrical power transfer. At the time of July 2017, it is the most popular standard in the world, with more than 200 million devices supporting this interface.
 AirFuel Alliance: 
 In January 2012, the IEEE announced the initiation of the Power Matters Alliance (PMA) under the IEEE Standards Association (IEEE-SA) Industry Connections. The alliance is formed to publish a set of standards for inductive power that are safe and energy-efficient, and have smart power management. The PMA will also focus on the creation of an inductive power ecosystem
 Rezence was an interface standard developed by the Alliance for Wireless Power (A4WP).
 A4WP and PMA merged into the AirFuel Alliance in 2015.

Electronic devices 

Many manufacturers of smartphones have started adding this technology into their devices, the majority adopting the Qi wireless charging standard. Major manufacturers such as Apple and Samsung produce many models of their phones in high volume with Qi capabilities. The popularity of the Qi standard has driven other manufacturers to adopt this as their own standard. Smartphones have become the driving force of this technology entering consumers’ homes, where many household technologies have been developed to utilize this technology.

Samsung and other companies have begun exploring the idea of "surface charging", building an inductive charging station into an entire surface such as a desk or table. Contrarily, Apple and Anker are pushing a dock-based charging platform. This includes charging pads and disks that have a much smaller footprint. These are geared for consumers who wish to have smaller chargers that would be located in common areas and blend in with the current décor of their home. Due to the adoption of the Qi standard of wireless charging, any of these chargers will work with any phone as long as it is Qi capable.

Another development is reverse wireless charging, which allows a mobile phone to wirelessly discharge its own battery into another device.

Examples

 Oral-B rechargeable toothbrushes by the Braun company have used inductive charging since the early 1990s.
 At the Consumer Electronics Show (CES) in January 2007, Visteon unveiled its inductive charging system for in-vehicle use that could charge only specially made cell phones to MP3 players with compatible receivers.
 April 28, 2009: An Energizer inductive charging station for the Wii remote was reported on IGN.
 At CES in January 2009, Palm, Inc. announced its new Pre smartphone would be available with an optional inductive charger accessory, the "Touchstone". The charger came with a required special backplate that became standard on the subsequent Pre Plus model announced at CES 2010. This was also featured on later Pixi, Pixi Plus, and Veer 4G smartphones. Upon launch in 2011, the ill-fated HP Touchpad tablet (after HP's acquisition of Palm Inc.) had a built in touchstone coil that doubled as an antenna for its NFC-like Touch to Share feature.
 March 24, 2013: Samsung launched the Galaxy S3, which supports an optionally retrofittable back cover accessory, included in their separate “Wireless Charging Kit”.
 Nokia announced on September 5, 2012, the Lumia 920 and Lumia 820, which supports respectively integrate inductive charging and inductive charging with an accessory back. 
 March 15, 2013: Samsung launched the Galaxy S4, which supports inductive charging with an accessory back cover.
 July 26, 2013: Google and ASUS launched the Nexus 7 2013 Edition with integrated inductive charging.
 September 9, 2014: Apple announced Apple Watch (released on April 24, 2015), which uses wireless inductive charging.
 September 12, 2017: Apple announced the AirPower wireless charging mat. It was meant to be capable of charging an iPhone, an Apple Watch, and AirPods simultaneously; the product however was never released. On September 12, 2018, Apple removed most mentions of the AirPower from its website and on March 29, 2019, it canceled the product completely.

Qi devices

 Nokia launched two smartphones (the Lumia 820 and Lumia 920) on 5 September 2012, which feature Qi inductive charging.
 Google and LG launched the Nexus 4 in October 2012 which supports inductive charging using the Qi standard.
 Motorola Mobility launched its Droid 3 and Droid 4, both optionally support the Qi standard.
 On November 21, 2012 HTC launched the Droid DNA, which also supports the Qi standard.
 October 31, 2013 Google and LG launched the Nexus 5, which supports inductive charging with Qi.
April 14, 2014 Samsung launched the Galaxy S5 that supports Qi wireless charging with either a wireless charging back or receiver.
November 20, 2015 Microsoft launched the Lumia 950 XL and Lumia 950 which support charging with the Qi standard.
February 22, 2016 Samsung announced its new flagship Galaxy S7 and S7 Edge which use an interface that is almost the same as Qi. The Samsung Galaxy S8 and Samsung Galaxy Note 8 released in 2017 also feature Qi wireless charging technology. 
 September 12, 2017 Apple announced that the iPhone 8 and iPhone X would feature wireless Qi standard charging.

Furniture
Ikea has a series of wireless charging furniture that supports the Qi standard.

Dual standard

 March 3, 2015: Samsung announced its new flagship Galaxy S6 and S6 Edge with wireless inductive charging through both Qi and PMA compatible chargers. All phones in the Samsung Galaxy S and Note lines following the S6 have supported wireless charging. 
 November 6, 2015 BlackBerry released its new flagship BlackBerry Priv, the first BlackBerry phone to support wireless inductive charging through both Qi and PMA compatible chargers.

Research and other

 Transcutaneous Energy Transfer (TET) systems in artificial hearts and other surgically implanted devices.
 In 2006, researchers at the Massachusetts Institute of Technology reported that they had discovered an efficient way to transfer power between coils separated by a few meters. The team, led by Marin Soljačić, theorized that they could extend the distance between the coils by adding resonance to the equation. The MIT inductive power project, called WiTricity, uses a curved coil and capacitive plates.
 In 2012 the Russian private museum Grand Maket Rossiya opened featuring inductive charging on its model car exhibits.
 As of 2017, Disney Research has been developing and researching room-scale inductive charging for multiple devices.

Transportation

Electric vehicle wireless power transfer or wireless charging is generally divided into three categories: stationary charging when the vehicle is parked for an extended period of time; dynamic charging when the vehicle is driven on roads or highways; and quasi-dynamic or semi-dynamic charging, when the vehicle moves at low speeds between stops, for example when a taxi slowly drives at a taxi rank. Inductive charging is not considered a mature dynamic charging technology as it delivers the least power of the three electric road technologies, its receivers lose 20%-25% of the supplied power when installed on trucks, and its health effects have yet to be documented, according to a French government working group on electric roads.

Stationary charging
In one inductive charging system, one winding is attached to the underside of the car, and the other stays on the floor of the garage. The major advantage of the inductive approach for vehicle charging is that there is no possibility of electric shock, as there are no exposed conductors, although interlocks, special connectors and RCDs (ground fault interruptors, or GFIs) can make conductive coupling nearly as safe. An inductive charging proponent from Toyota contended in 1998 that overall cost differences were minimal, while a conductive charging proponent from Ford contended that conductive charging was more cost efficient.

From 2010 onwards car makers signaled interest in wireless charging as another piece of the digital cockpit. A group was launched in May 2010 by the Consumer Electronics Association to set a baseline for interoperability for chargers. In one sign of the road ahead a General Motors executive is chairing the standards, effort group. Toyota and Ford managers said they also are interested in the technology and the standards effort.

Daimler's Head of Future Mobility, Professor Herbert Kohler, however, has expressed caution and said the inductive charging for EVs is at least 15 years away (from 2011) and the safety aspects of inductive charging for EVs have yet to be looked into in greater detail. For example, what would happen if someone with a pacemaker is inside the vehicle? Another downside is that the technology requires a precise alignment between the inductive pick-up and the charging facility.

In November 2011, the Mayor of London, Boris Johnson, and Qualcomm announced a trial of 13 wireless charging points and 50 EVs in the Shoreditch area of London's Tech City, due to be rolled out in early 2012. In October 2014, the University of Utah in Salt Lake City, Utah added an electric bus to its mass transit fleet that uses an induction plate at the end of its route to recharge. UTA, the regional public transportation agency, plans to introduce similar buses in 2018. In November 2012 wireless charging was introduced with 3 buses in Utrecht, The Netherlands. January 2015, eight electric buses were introduced to Milton Keynes, England, which uses inductive charging in the road with proov/ipt technology at either end of the journey to prolong overnight charges., Later bus routes in Bristol, London and Madrid followed.

Dynamic charging
The first working prototype of an electric vehicle that charges wirelessly while driving, which is known as "dynamic wireless charging" or "dynamic wireless power transfer", is generally regarded to have been developed at the University of California, Berkeley in the 1980s and 1990s. The first commercialized dynamic wireless charging system, Online Electric Vehicle (OLEV), was developed as early as 2009 by researchers at the Korea Advanced Institute of Science and Technology (KAIST). Vehicles using the system draw power from a power source underneath the road surface, which is an array of inductive rails or coils. Commercialization efforts of the technology have not been successful because of high costs, and its main technical challenge is low efficiency. Dynamic inductive charging infrastructure was found to increase the occurrence of reflective cracks in road surfaces. As of 2021, companies and organizations such as Vedecom, Magment, Electreon, and IPT are developing dynamic inductive coil charging technologies. IPT is additionally developing a system that uses inductive rails instead of coils, as the current standards which use coils are "extremely expensive" for dynamic charging, according to the CEO of IPT.

Research and development 
Work and experimentation is currently underway in designing this technology to be applied to electric vehicles. This could be implemented by using a predefined path or conductors that would transfer power across an air gap and charge the vehicle on a predefined path such as a wireless charging lane. Vehicles that could take advantage of this type of wireless charging lane to extend the range of their onboard batteries are already on the road. Some of the issues that are currently preventing these lanes from becoming widespread is the initial cost associated with installing this infrastructure that would benefit only a small percentage of vehicles currently on the road. Another complication is tracking how much power each vehicle was consuming/pulling from the lane. Without a commercial way to monetize this technology, many cities have already turned down plans to include these lanes in their public works spending packages. However this doesn't mean that cars are unable to utilize large scale wireless charging. The first commercial steps are already being taken with wireless mats that allow electric vehicles to be charged without a corded connection while parked on a charging mat. These large scale projects have come with some issues which include the production of large amounts of heat between the two charging surfaces and may cause a safety issue. Currently companies are designing new heat dispersion methods by which they can combat this excess heat. These companies include most major electric vehicle manufacturers, such as Tesla, Toyota, and BMW.

Examples

 EPCOT Universe of Energy is equipped with moving theater "pews," which take passengers/viewers through the exhibit. They are self-propelled, and inductively recharged when at rest. This exhibit with the recharging technology was in place ca. 2003.
 Hughes Electronics developed the Magne Charge interface for General Motors. The General Motors EV1 electric car was charged by inserting an inductive charging paddle into a receptacle on the vehicle. General Motors and Toyota agreed on this interface and it was also used in the Chevrolet S-10 EV and Toyota RAV4 EV vehicles.
September 2015 Audi Wireless Charging (AWC) presented a 3.6 kW inductive charger during the 66th International Motor Show (IAA) 2015.
September 17, 2015 Bombardier-Transportation PRIMOVE presented a 3.6 kW Charger for cars, which was developed at Site in Mannheim Germany.
Transport for London has introduced inductive charging in a trial for double-decker buses in London.
 Magne Charge inductive charging was employed by several types of electric vehicles around 1998, but was discontinued after the California Air Resources Board selected the SAE J1772-2001, or "Avcon", conductive charging interface for electric vehicles in California in June 2001.
In 1997 Conductix Wampler started with wireless charging in Germany, In 2002 20 buses started in operation In Turin with 60 kW charging. In 2013 the IPT technology was bought by Proov. In 2008 the technology was already used in the house of the future in Berlin with Mercedes A Class. Later Evatran also began development of Plugless Power, an inductive charging system it claims is the world's first hands-free, plugless, proximity charging system for Electric Vehicles. With the participation of the local municipality and several businesses, field trials were begun in March 2010. The first system was sold to Google in 2011 for employee use at the Mountain View campus.
Evatran began selling the Plugless L2 Wireless charging system to the public in 2014.
 Volvo Group invested in January 2019 in U.S.-based wireless charging specialist Momentum Dynamics. Volvo and Momentum Dynamics will run a three-year pilot project, starting in 2022, for wireless charging of electric taxis in taxi ranks.
BRUSA Elektronik AG, a specialist provider and development company for electric vehicles, offers a wireless charging module named ICS with 3.7 kW power.
A partnership between Cabonline, Jaguar, Momentum Dynamics, and Fortum Recharge is launching a wireless charging taxi fleet in Oslo, Norway. The fleet consists of 25 Jaguar I-Pace SUVs equipped with inductive charging pads rated at 50-75 kW. The pads use resonant inductive coupling operating at 85 Hz to improve wireless charging efficiency and range.
On February 3, 2022, Hyundai Motor Group developed a wireless charging system for electric vehicles using the principle of magnetic induction. Power is transmitted to the vehicle through resonance between the magnetic pad at the bottom of the charging space and the magnetic pad at the bottom of the vehicle. The transmitted power is stored in the battery through a converter in the vehicle system. It was applied on a trial basis at Genesis Motor EV charging station located in South Korea.

Medical implications 
Wireless charging is making an impact in the medical sector by means of being able to charge implants and sensors long-term that is located beneath the skin. Multiple companies offer rechargeable medical implant (e.g. implantable neurostimulators) which use inductive charging. Researchers have been able to print wireless power transmitting antenna on flexible materials that could be placed under the skin of patients. This could mean that under skin devices that could monitor the patient status could have a longer-term life and provide long observation or monitoring periods that could lead to better diagnosis from doctors. These devices may also make charging devices like pacemakers easier on the patient rather than having an exposed portion of the device pushing through the skin to allow corded charging. This technology would allow a completely implanted device making it safer for the patient. It is unclear if this technology will be approved for use – more research is needed on the safety of these devices. While these flexible polymers are safer than ridged sets of diodes they can be more susceptible to tearing during either placement or removal due to the fragile nature of the antenna that is printed on the plastic material. While these medical based applications seem very specific the high-speed power transfer that is achieved with these flexible antennas is being looked at for larger broader applications.

See also

 Charging station
 Conductive wireless charging
 Ground-level power supply
 Wardenclyffe Tower
 Wireless power transfer
 Wireless Power Consortium

References

External links
 How Inductors Work
 How Electric Toothbrushes Recharge Using Inductors
 Wireless Electricity Is Here
 Wireless charging
 Electric Bus Rapidly Recharges Using Wireless Charge Plates at Stops  – Wired
 Tesla Tower – Inductive charging in year 1900
 Wireless Qi Charger, DiodeGoneWild on YouTube 16 August 2017

Wireless energy transfer